is a Japanese former football player who last played for Blaublitz Akita.

Career

Blaublitz Akita
Tanaka signed with Blaublitz Akita for the 2019 season.

Club statistics
Updated to 31 December 2020.

Honours
 Blaublitz Akita
 J3 League (1): 2020

References

External links
Profile at Consadole Sapporo

1988 births
Living people
Kansai University alumni
Association football people from Shiga Prefecture
Japanese footballers
J1 League players
J2 League players
J3 League players
Kawasaki Frontale players
Tochigi SC players
Gainare Tottori players
Mito HollyHock players
Vissel Kobe players
Hokkaido Consadole Sapporo players
Blaublitz Akita players
Association football defenders
Universiade bronze medalists for Japan
Universiade medalists in football
Medalists at the 2009 Summer Universiade